St. Louis cuisine is the culinary culture of the Greater St. Louis area, which comprises and completely surrounds the independent city of St. Louis (its principal city) and includes parts of both the U.S. states of Missouri and Illinois.

History and composition 

An independent city and a major U.S. port in the state of Missouri, St. Louis dates to an early French settlement in 1764. Built along the western bank of the Mississippi river, which marks the border of Missouri with Illinois, it was founded by French fur traders and Pierre Laclède and Auguste Chouteau, and named after the medieval French King, Louis IX. 

Spain took control of the region after defeating France in the Seven Years' War in 1764. France regained control in 1800, but sold it to the United States three years later in the Louisiana Purchase. 

St. Louis grew quickly in the 19th century, becoming America's fourth-largest city by 1904, when it hosted the Louisiana Purchase Exposition and the Summer Olympics.

St. Louis cuisine 
A number of foods are specific to, or known to have originated in St. Louis.

St. Louis-style pizza 

St. Louis has a variation of pizza which features provel cheese, a very thin crust, and is often square cut. Imo's Pizza is a well-known seller of St. Louis-style pizza.

Gooey butter cake 

Gooey butter cake is a type of cake traditionally made in, and invented in, St. Louis. It is served locally as a breakfast pastry, though also served as a dessert.

Toasted ravioli 

Toasted ravioli is breaded deep-fried ravioli, usually served as an appetizer. Generally, some type of meat is wrapped in square ravioli, breaded and deep fried until the pasta shell becomes slightly crispy, dry and browned. Vegetarian options exist, generally consisting of cheese, spinach, or mushroom fillings. Toasted ravioli is generally served with marinara sauce for dipping.

St. Paul sandwich 
A St. Paul sandwich is a type of sandwich served at many Chinese takeout restaurants in St. Louis. The sandwich consists of an egg foo young patty (made with mung bean sprouts and minced white onions) served with dill pickle slices, white onion, mayonnaise, and lettuce between two slices of white bread. The St. Paul sandwich also comes in different combinations and specials, such as chicken, pork, shrimp, beef, and other varieties.  Steven Yuen is said to have invented the sandwich in the 1940s for his restaurant Park Chop Suey.

Slinger 
A slinger is an American Midwest diner specialty typically consisting of two eggs, hash browns, and a ground beef (or other type of meat) patty, all covered in chili con carne (with or without beans) and generously topped with cheese (cheddar or American) and onions. The eggs can be any style. Hot sauce is usually served on the side. The slinger is considered to be a St. Louis late-night culinary original. It is described as "a hometown culinary invention: a mishmash of meat, hash-fried potatoes, eggs, and chili, sided with your choice of ham, sausage, bacon, hamburger patties, or an entire T-bone steak.

St. Louis-style barbecue and pork steaks 
See St. Louis-style barbecue and pork steak.

Gerber sandwich 
A Gerber sandwich is a hot, open faced sandwich served in St. Louis. The Gerber consists of a half section of Italian or French bread, spread with garlic butter and topped with ham and Provel cheese, seasoned with a sprinkling of paprika and then toasted.

Fried brain sandwiches 
A fried brain sandwich is a sandwich of sliced, fried calves' brains on sliced buttered bread, optionally served with raw onion, lettuce and tomato.

See also 

 Cuisine of the Midwestern United States
 Gerber sandwich
 Horseshoe sandwich
 Louisiana Purchase Exposition
 Quad City-style pizza
 Red Hot Riplets
 Slinger (dish)
 St. Paul sandwich

References 

Cuisine of St. Louis
Culture of St. Louis